School City of East Chicago often shortened to SCEC is a school district headquartered in East Chicago, Indiana. The district serves all of East Chicago.

Mandatory Uniform Policies
All district students, except those with parent or religious waivers and those with too much financial hardship to abide by the rule, are required to abide by a dress code that restricts colors worn by students. Students may wear solid red, white, or navy blue shirts, including collared shirts, T-shirts, blouses, turtlenecks, sweaters, and sweatshirts. Students may wear navy blue bottoms, including trousers, skirts, skorts, and shorts. Students may wear dress or athletic shoes colored navy blue, black, white, or red. Belts and shoelaces must be solid colors. Students may wear outfits from a "nationally recognized youth organization" such as the Boy Scouts of America or Girl Scouts of the USA on meeting days.

Member schools

Academics
The total student graduation rate for the district was 72.8%, as of the 2018-19 school year.

References

External links

 School City of East Chicago

Education in Lake County, Indiana
School districts in Indiana
East Chicago, Indiana
1888 establishments in Indiana